China Cinda Asset Management Co., Ltd. known as China Cinda or just Cinda is a Chinese merchant bank and asset management company. The corporation was founded as a state-owned enterprise and a bad bank for China Construction Bank in 1999. The bank received shares by debt-to-equity swap on non-performing loans. In 2010, the corporation became a "company limited by shares".

In 2013, part of the shares were started to float on Hong Kong Stock Exchange. In 2015 Cinda acquired Nanyang Commercial Bank from fellow state-controlled financial conglomerate Bank of China (Hong Kong).

Portfolio companies
 Baiyin Nonferrous (5.38%)
 China Unicom (via private equity fund)
 Daye Non-Ferrous Metals Mining (5.24%)
 Fenxi Mining Industry Group
 Jincheng Anthracite Mining Group (17.066%)
 Huozhou Coal Electricity Group (36.97%)
 Taiyuan Coal Gasification Group (11.15%)
 Xishan Coal Electricity Group (35.47%)
 SouthGobi Resources (through Novel Sunrise)

References

External links
 

Companies listed on the Hong Kong Stock Exchange
Financial services companies of China
Investment management companies of China
Government-owned companies of China
H shares